Camalot is a brand of spring-loaded camming devices manufactured by Black Diamond Equipment used to secure ropes while rock climbing.
Camalots use a dual-axle system, resulting in a slightly higher expansion range than similarly sized single axle units, however that results in significant weight penalty. Dual-axel was patented and for decades was only used by Black Diamond, however the patent has expired in 2005 and several other manufacturers began producing dual-axel cams, often also replicating Camalots sizes and coloring. Most notable Camelot look-alikes include DMM Dragons and Wild Country's New Friends.

Like other cams, Camalot lobes are in the shape of a logarithmic spiral, resulting in a constant angle between the cam and the rock at each contact point; this constant angle is designed to always provide the necessary friction to hold a cam in equilibrium.

Models
Black Diamond has produced several different models of Camalots:

References

External links
 bdel.com
 Duke SLCD Research
 Camalot Review with video

Black Diamond Rock Current Protection Offerings

Climbing equipment
Mountaineering equipment